McColl-Frontenac Oil Company Limited was a Canadian integrated oil company. It was created in 1927 as a result of a merger between two companies, McColl Brothers, founded by John McColl in 1873, and Frontenac Oil Refineries. Shares in the new company were acquired by the Texas Company (Texaco) and by 1941 it had acquired a majority ownership position of McColl-Frontenac. On 2 February 1959 the company was renamed Texaco Canada Limited, which on 1 June 1978 became Texaco Canada Incorporated. McColl-Frontenac was known for its branding of its oil and products as "Red Indian." In 1989, Texaco Canada was acquired by Ultramar. Non retail operations continued as Texaco Canada Petroleum Incorporated until 1995.

After Ultramar acquired Texaco Canada Inc in 1989, it renamed the company McColl-Frontenac Inc. This company remains registered.

References

External links
Article in the newsletter of the Petroleum History Society

Companies based in Montreal
Companies disestablished in 1989
Companies established in 1927
Defunct companies of Canada
Defunct energy companies of Canada
Defunct oil companies
Defunct oil and gas companies of Canada
Oil and gas companies
Oil companies of Canada
Texaco